Kartashevka is a rural locality (a village) in Orlovsky Selsoviet, Arkhangelsky District, Bashkortostan, Russia. The population was 103 as of 2010. There are 2 streets.

Geography 
Kartashevka is located 25 km west of Arkhangelskoye (the district's administrative centre) by road. Pribelsky is the nearest rural locality.

References 

Rural localities in Arkhangelsky District